State Road 411 (NM 411) is a  state highway in the US state of New Mexico. NM 411's western terminus is at NM 406 northeast of Clayton, and the eastern terminus is at County Route A077 northeast of Clayton.

Major intersections

See also

References

411
Transportation in Union County, New Mexico